Vihreäsaari is an uninhabited island and a neighbourhood in the Tuira area in the city of Oulu, Finland. It is separated from the Hietasaari island by the Johteensalmi strait.

Most of the area of the district is used by the facilities of the Port of Oulu. The Vihreäsaari harbour is the most important oil dock in the city.

References

External links 

Districts of Oulu
Islands of Finland
Uninhabited islands of Finland